Samsung Galaxy A9 or Samsung Galaxy A9 2016 Edition is an Android phablet produced by Samsung Electronics. It was introduced on January 15, 2016, along with the Samsung Galaxy A3 (2016), Samsung Galaxy A5 (2016), and Samsung Galaxy A7 (2016)

References 

 

Samsung Galaxy
Mobile phones introduced in 2015
Samsung mobile phones
Android (operating system) devices
Discontinued smartphones